A list of films produced in France in 1936:

See also
 1936 in France

References

External links
 French films of 1936 at the Internet Movie Database
French films of 1936 at Cinema-francais.fr

1936
Films
French